
Year 679 (DCLXXIX) was a common year starting on Saturday (link will display the full calendar) of the Julian calendar. The denomination 679 for this year has been used since the early medieval period, when the Anno Domini calendar era became the prevalent method in Europe for naming years.

Events 
 By place 

 Byzantine Empire 
 Emperor Constantine IV signs a peace treaty, of a nominal 30-year duration, with Caliph Muawiyah I of the Umayyad Caliphate. Constantine pays an annual tribute of 3,000 (nomismata) pounds of gold, 50 horses and 50 slaves. The Arab garrisons are withdrawn from their bases on the Byzantine coastlands, including Crete & Cyzicus.

 Europe 
 December 23 – King Dagobert II is murdered in a hunting accident, near Stenay-sur-Meuse (Ardennes), probably on orders from Pepin of Herstal, the mayor of the palace of Austrasia. He is succeeded by Theuderic III, who becomes sole ruler of the Frankish Kingdom.

 Britain 
 King Æthelred of Mercia marries Princess Osthryth, sister of King Ecgfrith of Northumbria (approximate date).

 Americas 
 Nuun Ujol Chaak, an ajaw of the Maya city of Tikal, is by this year deceased, after his final defeat at the hands of B'alaj Chan K'awiil, during the Second Tikal-Calakmul War.

 By topic 

 Religion 
 Adomnán, clerical lawyer, becomes abbot of the monastery of Iona Abbey, located on the island of Iona (modern Scotland).
 October 2 – Leodegar, bishop of Autun, is tortured and executed by Neustrian nobles at Fécamp (Normandy).

Births 
 Sima Zhen, Chinese historian (d. 732)
 Zachary, pope of the Catholic Church (d. 752)

Deaths 
 June 23 – Æthelthryth, queen of Northumbria
 October 2, Leodegar, bishop of Autun
 December 23 – Dagobert II, king of Austrasia
 Ælfwine, king of Deira (approximate date)
 Cenn Fáelad mac Ailella, Irish scholar
 Dai Zhide, chancellor of the Tang Dynasty
 Sigebert IV, Frankish prince (approximate date)
 Xu Yushi, chancellor of the Tang Dynasty

References

Sources